Sabbir Nasir (born 24 October 1972) is a Bangladeshi singer, composer, songwriter. He works on folk fusion, indie pop and blues music. He started performing on stage at the age of 16. He was the vocalist and the lead guitarist of different bands. His last band, Metamorphosis published their first and last album in 1998. Since 1998 till 2018, Sabbir was out of the musical scene. He started singing again in 2018 at the studios and on stages and some of his folk and Blues songs became very much popular among Bangladeshi and Indian Audience. Some of his top Folk singles are "Binodini Rai" which is a duet song, sung along with Sampa Biswas from India, "Amare Dia Dilam Tomare", "Tumi Dome Dom" etc. He got CJFB Award in 2020 for his Single "Horsho". He was recognized with Safekeeper Channel i Digital Award in 2021 for his song "Amare Dia Dilam Tomare".In 2021, for his single "Adha" he won the bronze award in the Male singer category at the Global Music Awards program, organised by a California-based organisation. His first English single "Drowning" was featured in various international magazines.

Early life And Education 
Nasir, born and raised in Khulna, attended Saint Joseph High School of the same district. He graduated from Bangladesh University of Engineering and Technology BUET, studying Bachelor of Science Mechanical Engineering. He also attended Institute of Business Administration ( IBA) where he attained his MBA. He also obtained Advanced Certificate for Executives on Technology, Innovation and Management from Massachusetts Institute of Technology in 2017, Executive Program in General Management from MIT Sloan School of Management in 2017, Retail Forum for Senior Leaders from Harvard Business School, Executive Education in the year 2018. The Berkeley Program in Data Science and Analytics from UC Berkeley Haas School Of Management at Berkeley in 2018.

Career 
He sang in the Playback in different films e.g. at "Daymukti" with Konal at Pritilota movie etc. This movie about the life of Pritilata Waddedar. "Binodini Rai" sung by Sabbir Nasir and Kolkata-based singer Shampa Biswas broke all records on social media platforms with more than one crore views.

Awards 

 CJFB Award- 2020
 Safekeeper Channel i Digital Award - 2021
 Global Music Awards - 2021- (Bronze award winner)
 Babisas Award 2022
 Oikko Channel i Music Awards 2022
 BCRA Best Folk Singer Award 2022

Discography

References 

1972 births
Living people
People from Khulna District
Bangladeshi male singer-songwriters
Bangladeshi musicians
Bangladeshi guitarists